Aarop is a 1974 Indian Hindi romance film, laced with crime and suspense, directed by Atma Ram, who is the brother of the legendary film maker Guru Dutt, who made intense films with powerful social themes. Atma Ram completed many of Guru Dutt's films after his mysterious suicide. The writers were Vrajendra Gaur (dialogue) and Ram Govind (screenplay). The film stars Vinod Khanna, Saira Banu and Vinod Mehra in pivotal roles and Rehman as villain. Bhupen Hazarika scored the music for lyrics penned by Maya Govind. The song "Naino mein darpan hai, darpan mein koi.." by Kishore Kumar and Lata Mangeshkar is still quite popular.

Story
Aarop is the story of Subhash (Vinod Khanna), as the protagonist, crusader of people's rights who fights against injustices/crime, in a place called Nandgaon, by means of running a fiery newspaper called "Mashaal", of which he is the editor and his friend Ravi (Vinod Mehra) is the lawyer. They are helped by Aruna (Saira Banu), who is a school teacher, and adopted daughter of the Krishna temple priest, Pujariji (Bharat Bhushan).

They come across hard-core criminals when they represent their conflicts with the 3 Aces Club; a gambling bar and heinous vice den run by Kanchan (Bindu) and her highly placed, powerful businessman crony Makhan Lal Singh (Rehman), who have a bevy of corrupt politicians in their pockets and a gang of armed goons with Caesar (Gulshan Arora) as the main antagonist. Subhash starts publishing against the 3 Aces Club with a vengeance, who retaliate by burning down his press. Thankfully, the fire is put out in time. But then they are gripped in a no-win situation by Makhan Lal Singh, who unleashes his organized crime tactics and throws both Ravi as a lawyer and Aruna as a school teacher out of work and chokes the finances of the press by making its owner Dhondu Dada (Johnny Walker), their gambling client and looting all the press assets. This makes the enraged Subhash take out his gun from his drawer and advance towards the 3 Aces Club to finish off Kanchan. When he reaches there and is about to shoot,  Kanchan is shot by the goons of Makhan Lal Singh. Subhash, unaware of the culprits, flees from the scene,  reaches Aruna's temple and gives the gun to her, to hide. However, he is caught by the police and his case in court is fought by Ravi.  Advocate Desai (Satyen Kappu) fights for the prosecution.

The story is interlaced by a romance between Subhash and Aruna, and an undisclosed yearning by Ravi to make Aruna his own. Aruna accuses Ravi that he is deliberating lapsing in saving Subhash from the gallows, for a murder he did not commit, which makes Ravi vehemently oppose,  and reach the Ballistic report expert Shrivastav's (Raj Mehra) house, who has hidden the second gun that killed Kanchan. With the help of Tony (Paintal),  who is a free-lance journalist and photographer, he is able to pin down the Ballistics expert. But before he can present this evidence to court a fight ensues between the goons of Makhan Lal Singh and personnel of the Mashaal press, wherein Ravi, in trying to save Subhash, is killed by Makhan Lal Singh. The story ends with  Makhan Lal Singh being caught by the police, along with his goons, along with Dwarka (Kundan) who killed Kanchan.

Cast
Vinod Khanna as Subhash Tripathi
Saira Banu as Aruna
Vinod Mehra as Ravi
Rehman as Makhanlal Singh
Johnny Walker as Dhondu Dada
Bindu as Kanchan
Bharat Bhushan as Pujariji
Keshto Mukherjee as Kunwarelal
Paintal (comedian) as Tony
Gulshan Arora as Caesar
Kundan as Dwarka
Savita	 as Kalawati
Satyendra Kapoor Satyen Kappu as Advocate Desai (Public Prosecutor)
Raj Mehra as Shrivastav as Ballistic Expert
Murad as Judge 1
Sabina as Party Girl
 Rajan Haksar as Chairman of Municipal

Songs
All songs wete written by Maya Govind.

References

External links
 

1974 films
1970s Hindi-language films
1970s romance films
Hindi-language romance films
Indian romance films